Baptisia bracteata, otherwise known as longbract wild indigo, long-bract wild indigo, long-bracted wild indigo, plains wild indigo, cream false indigo, or cream wild indigo, is a perennial herbaceous plant in the Fabaceae (bean) family that is native to the central and eastern United States. It is one of the earliest blooming species of Baptisia, beginning to bloom in March in certain areas of the United States. The flower clusters (racemes) spread out sideways or sprawl across the ground, unlike most other Baptisia species, which have vertical racemes.

Description
The stems are round and light green to purple. They have smooth margins and are usually oblanceolate in shape.

The bloom color ranges from white to creamy yellow.

Etymology
The genus name Baptisia comes from the Greek word meaning "to dye". The specific epithet bracteata is from a Latin word meaning "having bracts".

Distribution and habitat
B. bracteata is native in the United States from Minnesota to the north, Texas to the west and south, and North Carolina to the east. It can be found in prairies, rocky woods, fields, and along streams.

Ecology
The flowers bloom April to June and are pollinated by bumblebees, which are active making their nests at this time. The caterpillars of several skippers eat the leaves, including the wild indigo duskywing and hoary edge. The plant is poisonous to mammalian herbivores.

References

External links

Flora of the Eastern United States
Sophoreae